Jesus: A Portrait is a 2008 Christological book by the Australian Jesuit priest and academic Gerald O'Collins.

Synopsis
The testimony embodied in the Gospels and coming from eyewitnesses provides the substance for O'Collins' book. The author states that to portray Jesus adequately is an impossible dream. Unlike his near contemporary Marcus Tullius Cicero (106-43 BC/BCE), he left no letters or other personal documents. The only time he was remembered as writing anything, came when he 'wrote with his finger on the ground'. This was in response to some scribes and Pharisees who had caught a woman in adultery and wanted Jesus to agree to her being stoned. According to several later manuscripts, Jesus wrote on the ground nothing about himself but 'the sins of each of them'. Jesus did not bequeath to his followers any written instructions, and he lived in almost total obscurity, except for the brief period of his public ministry. According to the testimony provided by the Synoptic Gospels, that ministry could have lasted as little as a year or eighteen months. John implies a period of two or three years. Even for the brief span of that ministry, much of the chronological sequence of events (except for the baptism of Jesus at the start and his passion at the end) is, by and large, irretrievably lost. The author therefore states that the fact that, explicitly and for the most part, Jesus did not proclaim himself but the kingdom of God, as well as the fact that he left no personal papers, makes access to his interior life difficult. In any case the Gospels rarely mention his motives or deal with his states of mind. These sources make it hard (but not impossible) to penetrate his inner life. But they do allow one to reconstruct much of the message, activity, claims, and impact of Jesus in the final years of his life, as well as glimpsing every now and then his feelings and intentions. This O'Collins does right through the book, with fluency and appropriate substantiation.

Jesus himself never wrote, O'Collins affirms, but he continues to speak through the writings of the evangelists. In drawing on the Gospels, O'Collins uses the widely accepted scheme of three stages in the transmission of testimony to Jesus' deeds and words: (1) the initial stage in his earthly life when his disciples and others spoke about him, repeated to others his teaching, and began interpreting his identity and mission; (2) the handing on by word of mouth or in writing of testimony about him after his death and resurrection; and (3) the authorial work of the four evangelists later in the first century.

Excerpt

Contents

Preface
 The Beauty of Jesus
 God's Kingdom in Person
 Divine and Human
 Jesus the Healer
 The Meanings of the Miracles
 Jesus the Story-teller
 The Parable of the Father's Love
 Jesus the Teacher
 Facing Death
 Jesus the Suffering Servant
 Jesus the Lord of Glory
 Jesus the Abiding Presence
Epilogue - Notes - Select Bibliography - Index of names

See also

Jesus Christ
Christology
Christian Theology
 Views on Jesus
 Jesuism
 Jews for Jesus
 Redeemer (Christianity)
 Lost years of Jesus
 Related lists
 List of books about Jesus
 List of founders of religious traditions
 List of people claimed to be Jesus
 List of people who have been considered deities

References

External links

 Complete Sayings of Jesus Christ In Parallel Latin & English
 The Jewish Roman World of Jesus
 Christology on Goodreads. Retrieved 31 October 2012
 Encyclopædia Britannica, Christology - full access article
 "Jesus Christ." Encyclopædia Britannica. 2009. Encyclopædia Britannica Online. 12 Nov. 2009
 From Jesus to Christ: The First Christians — documentary about Jesus' life and the early Church.

2008 non-fiction books
Books about Jesus
Jesus Christ
Catholic theology and doctrine
Christian theology books